Cole Mitchell Sprouse (born August 4, 1992) is an American actor and photographer. He is known for his role as Cody Martin on the Disney Channel series The Suite Life of Zack & Cody (2005–2008) and its spin-off series The Suite Life on Deck (2008–2011). In his early career, he appeared in various projects alongside his twin brother Dylan Sprouse. In 2017, Sprouse began starring as Jughead Jones on The CW television series Riverdale.

Early life
Cole Mitchell Sprouse was born in Arezzo, Italy, to American parents, Matthew Sprouse and Melanie Wright. He was born 15 minutes after his twin brother Dylan Sprouse and was named after jazz singer and pianist Nat King Cole. When the twins were four months old, the family moved back to their parents' native Long Beach, California.

In college, Sprouse majored in Geographic Information Systems in archaeology because his grandfather was a geologist and he was interested in earth science.

Career

1993–2012: Early roles as child actor

Cole and his brother, Dylan, began acting at the age of eight months following a suggestion from their grandmother, Jonine Booth Wright, who was a drama teacher and actress. Much of Sprouse's early career was shared with his brother—some of their earliest roles were shared roles as one baby or child in commercials, television shows, and films. Due to child labor laws in California restricting the amount of time children can be filmed in a day, casting twins in a single role allows more time for one character to be filmed. Some notable roles he shared with his brother include the characters of Patrick Kelly in the sitcom Grace Under Fire from 1993 to 1998, Julian in the 1999 film, Big Daddy, and young Pistachio Disguisey in 2002's The Master of Disguise. In 2001, Cole began appearing in episodes of NBC's television sitcom Friends, as Ross Geller's son, Ben; this role was his first role in which he did not appear with his brother. As he and his brother grew older, they began taking on more roles as separate characters but often still worked on the same projects. Their first role as separate characters in the same production was as kids in a MADtv sketch. Sprouse portrayed Cody Martin in the 2005 Disney Channel original series, The Suite Life of Zack & Cody alongside his brother; he reprised the role in the show's 2008 spinoff, The Suite Life on Deck and its related film.

2016–present: Post-university return to acting
On February 9, 2016, Sprouse was cast as Jughead Jones in The CW's teen drama series Riverdale, based on the characters of Archie Comics. The series premiered on January 26, 2017. In 2019, Sprouse starred in Five Feet Apart, a romantic drama which was released in March; he plays a cystic fibrosis patient who falls in love with a girl with the same disease. It was his second lead role in a major theatrical film, 20 years after his first, Big Daddy. Sprouse produced and starred in the eight-episode podcast Borrasca in 2020. In 2021, he was cast in Moonshot alongside Lana Condor.

Personal life
Sprouse is a fan of comics and worked at the Los Angeles comic store Meltdown.

Sprouse began attending New York University in 2011, after deferring one year. Initially interested in studying film and television production, he decided to enroll instead in the Gallatin School of Individualized Study, pursuing the humanities and in particular archaeology. He graduated alongside his brother in May 2015. Sprouse worked briefly in the field of archaeology, participating in excavations and performing lab work. He specialized in geographical information systems and satellite imaging. During his studies he performed summer digs in both Europe and Asia. While engaged in his undergraduate work, he unearthed a mask of Dionysus on a dig in Bulgaria.

Sprouse has an avid interest in photography. In 2011, he launched a personal photography website and took classes at NYU. He has shot assignments for major fashion publications including Teen Vogue, L'Uomo Vogue, The Sunday Times Style, and W Magazine, among others.

On May 31, 2020, Sprouse was arrested after he joined the protests in Los Angeles for racial justice after the murder of George Floyd.

Filmography

Film

Television

Podcast

Awards and nominations 

Among his several accolades, Sprouse is a 13-time nominee and eight-time winner of the Teen Choice Award. As a child actor, he received three Young Artist Award nominations for his roles in Big Daddy and The Suite Life of Zack & Cody.

Discography
"A Dream Is a Wish Your Heart Makes", Disneymania 4, 2005
"A Dream Is a Wish Your Heart Makes", Princess Disneymania, 2008

References

External links

1992 births
20th-century American male actors
21st-century American male actors
American male child actors
American male film actors
American male television actors
Identical twin male actors
Living people
People from Arezzo
Male actors from Long Beach, California
American identical twin child actors
People from Calabasas, California
New York University Gallatin School of Individualized Study alumni